B.A. or BA is an initialism standing for the Bachelor of Arts degree, a tertiary qualification.

B.A., BA, Ba, or ba may refer to:

Businesses and organizations 
 BAE Systems (LSE stock symbol BA)
 Bangladesh Army
 Bibliotheca Alexandrina, an Egyptian library and cultural center
 Boeing (NYSE stock symbol BA)
 Booksellers Association of the UK and Ireland
 Boston Acoustics, an audio equipment manufacturer
 Boston and Albany Railroad (reporting mark BA)
 British Airways (IATA airline code BA)
 British Association for the Advancement of Science
 Selskap med begrenset ansvar, a type of Norwegian company with limited liability
 Bundesagentur für Arbeit, Federal Employment Agency of Germany

Languages 
 Bashkir language (ISO 639 alpha-2 language code BA)
 Ba (Javanese) (ꦧ), a letter in the Javanese script
 Aka-Bo language, an Indian language, also known as Ba
 Arabic letter ب, named

People 
 Ba (given name)
 Ba (surname), common West African surname

Places

The Americas 
 The Bahamas (WMO country code BA)
 State of Bahia, Brazil (ISO 3166-2:BR code)
 Barber County, Kansas, United States (state county code)
 Buenos Aires, Argentina

Asia 
 Ba (state), a Chinese vassal state during the Zhou Dynasty (1045–256 BCE)
 Ba, a village in Tha Tum, Surin Province, Thailand
 Ba River (China)
 Bahrain (FIPS 10-4 country code)
 Bandra railway station (railway code)
 Tongde County ("Ba" in Tibetan), Hainan Tibetan Autonomous Prefecture, China

Europe 
 BA postcode area, UK, the Bath postcode area in south west England
 Ba (Ljig), village in Serbia
 Bad Aussee, Austria (vehicle registration code BA)
 Bamberg, Germany (vehicle registration code BA)
 Province of Bari, Italy (ISO 3166-2:IT code and vehicle registration code BA)
 Berane, Montenegro (vehicle registration code BA)
 Bosnia and Herzegovina's ISO 2-letter country code
 .ba, the top-level domain for Bosnia and Herzegovina
 Bratislava, Slovakia

Fiji 
 Ba (town), a town in Fiji
 Ba (Open Constituency, Fiji)
 Ba District, Fiji, an administrative district in Fiji
 Ba Province, Fiji
 Ba River (Fiji)

Science 
 Barium, symbol Ba, a chemical element
 Barye, a measurement unit of pressure
 Benzylamine, an organic chemical compound
 6-Benzylaminopurine, plant hormone
 Blood Alcohol content
 β amyloid, peptides of several amino acids that are involved in Alzheimer's disease 
 Ba, a genus of land snails in the family Charopidae, with one species Ba humbugi
 Brodmann area, region of cerebral cortex defined based on its cytoarchitectonics
 BA, designation for sublineages of the SARS-CoV-2 Omicron variant

Sport 
 Ba F.C., a Fijian football club based in Ba 
 Ba game, a version of medieval football played in Scotland
 Basketball Australia
 Batting average, a statistic in cricket and baseball
 Bowls Australia

Technology 
 Badass (bridges), a guitar bridge trade name of Leo Quan
 Balanced armature, a type of headphone technology
 Breathing apparatus (disambiguation), equipment which allows a person to breathe in a hostile environment
 British Association screw threads, a largely obsolete standard for small screw threads
 Buoyancy aid, a personal flotation device
 Ford BA Falcon, an Australian car
 NZR BA class, a steam locomotive classification used by the New Zealand Railways Department

Other uses 
 BA, dominical letter for a leap year starting on Saturday
 Ba or bꜣ, "personality", an Ancient Egyptian concept of the soul or spirit
 Ba, white dove used for religious sacrifices in Mandaeism
 Ba (pharaoh), or Horus Ba, a very early pharaoh who might have reigned in the First Dynasty of Egypt
 B. A. Baracus, a fictional character on the television series The A-Team
 Beerenauslese, a German late-harvest wine
 Business agent (labor), a position in some local trade unions
 Business analyst
 Business architecture
 Ya ba, tablets containing a mixture of methamphetamine and caffeine

See also 
 BAA (disambiguation)
 Loch Bà (disambiguation)